The National Photographic Association of the United States (1868–1880) formed "for the purpose of elevating and advancing the art of photography, and for the protection and furthering the interests of those who make their living by it." In particular, the group organized initially to prevent "the reissue of the ... ambrotype patent."

History

Through the years, officers of the society included 
W. Irving Adams, 
J. Baker, 
Abraham Bogardus, 
James Wallace Black, 
R. J. Chute, 
Benjamin French, 
Alfred Hall, 
Alfred Howe, 
Albert Southworth, 
W. H. Rhoads, 
Samuel Root
William Rulofson, 
J. F. Ryder, 
J. B. Webster, and Edward L. Wilson.

Conferences occurred annually, beginning in June 1869, with the "National Photographic Association Exposition and Convention" held in Boston. Its purpose was "to keep the public informed as to progress of photography, [to share] amongst photographers a knowledge of the improvements that are made both here and abroad, and to excite ... a taste for the new art. An exhibition will be formed to contain the pictures of contemporary artists. ...There will also be shown various photographic apparatus, chemicals. ... A course of lectures on the chemical properties of light will be delivered by a number of scientific gentlemen."  Subsequent conventions took place in:  Cleveland (June 7–10, 1870) ("it is thought 400 members will be present. The photographs on exhibition are the largest collection ever seen in this country, and are the finest specimens");  Philadelphia (June 1871);  St. Louis (1872);  Buffalo (1873);  Chicago (July 1874);  
San Francisco (July 1875);  and Philadelphia (1876).

At the 1871 convention in Philadelphia, events included "a grand stereopticon and lantern exhibition; ...business and scientific meetings." "The whole affair is to be a grand one, conducted on a magnificent scale. The railroad companies have made liberal arrangements for delegates, and at least one thousand photographers are expected."  Among the numerous exhibitors in Horticultural Hall:

 A. M. Allen, Pottsville PA
 D. H. Anderson, Richmond VA
 E. & H. T. Anthony & Co., NY
 B. F. Battels, Akron, OH
 W. G. Basset, Erie PA
 Robert Benecke, St. Louis
 Bennermann & Wilson
 Herman Boettger, Philadelphia
 A. Bogardus, NY
 J. H. Bostwick, Bristol PA
 N. H. Bussey, Baltimore
 W. M. Chase, Baltimore
 Charles Cooper & Co., NY
 Cramer, Gross & Co., St. Louis
 James Cremer, Philadelphia
 Crosscup & West
 Dinsmore & Wilson, Baltimore
 B. L. H. Dobbs, Pittsburg
 L. Dubernol, NY
 E. J. Foss, Boston
 Gihon & Thompson, Philadelphia
 F. Gutekunst, Philadelphia

 William H. Harding
 E. E. Henry, Kansas
 Jones & Stiff, Salem MA
 Kilburn Brothers, Littleton NH
 R. Knecht, Paterson NY
 A. Kracan, Iowa
 Oscar Kunath, NY
 W. Kurtz, NY
 M. Carey Lea, Philadelphia
 Lenox Glass Co., Massachusetts
 D. Lothrop, Philadelphia
 Maddock & Co., NY
 J.F. Meyer
 Miltz & Swart, Peoria, Ill.
 J. Morrey
 Albert Moore, Philadelphia
 J. W. Morgeneier, Sheboygan, Michigan
 William Nottmann, Montreal
 Oster, Philadelphia
 Lewis Pattberg & Bro., NY
 W. S. Pendleton, Brooklyn
 L. D. Philippi, Philadelphia

 Photograph Relief Printing Co., Philadelphia
 Powers & Weightman
 J. Reid, Paterson NJ
 William H. Rhoads, Philadelphia
 J. F. Ryder, Cleveland OH
 S. W. Sawyer, Chicago
 Schneider & Son, Philadelphia
 Andrew Scholler, St. Louis
 Scoville Manufacturing Co.
 F. L. Stuber, Bethlehem PA
 H. K. P. Trask
 Henry Peach Robinson and Nelson King Cherrill, Tunbridge, England
 William Valk, Philadelphia
 Leon Van Loo, Cincinnati
 Vansyckel & Burr, Philadelphia
 Dr. H. Vogel, Berlin
 C. E. Wallin, Indiana
 Walmsley & Co., Philadelphia
 F. A. Wenderoth, Philadelphia
 Wilson, Hood & Co., Philadelphia
 C. A. Zimmerman, St. Paul MN

Growing membership and conference attendance proved the success of the organization. By 1873, "we can see the leaven working which was scattered at the birth of the National Photographic Association, and the result is most promising. The whole body photographic is feeling its influence in one way or another, and the thirst for more knowledge is very apparent in the increased attendance upon and interest in the annual conventions and exhibitions."

However, according to one account, by the late 1870s "photographers were ... assailed on every side by process-vendors and patentees, and 'lightning' processes were pushed against them with great vigor, and many victims were caught. The Executive Committee of the N.P.A. became discouraged, and, largely in debt, the society died."

In 1880 the group merged with the Photographers Association of America (later called the Professional Photographers of America).

References

Further reading
 Albert Sands Southworth. An Address to the National Photographic Association of the United States. Philadelphia Photographer Oct. 1871.
 Manual of the National Photographic Association of the United States. Philadelphia : Printed by Sherman & Co., 1873.
 Report of the Sixth Annual Convention of the National Photographic Association of the United States, held at Chicago, Illinois, July 1874. Philadelphia: 1874.

External links
 
 Flickr. Business card of William N. Hobbs, Exeter NH, member of the NPA.
 Flickr. Business card of John F. Nice, Williamsport, Pennsylvania, member of the NPA.
 https://www.flickr.com/photos/60606308@N08/8135288105/in/photolist-doTtJ2-dRcLNk-dRcLSx-dRcKsV-dRij2b-dRiiWy-dRcLDF-dRikqy-dRijkG-dRig9N-ffyLGe-dRcLnz-dRcGtT-dRijfQ-dRijYC-dRifJb-dRijQd-dRcL4B-dRijUs-dRijFE-dRiidy-dRcGbH-dRcKRn-iKX1uh-bMSDKx-dRiijo-dRifSE-dRcGdH-dRexX4-dRcJwH-cS2oUb-czNiMb-byXYYb-dagnUL-dRcLsk-c9FE9w-bxPANj-dWYuny-c9FE7f-dWSQmV-bQQsHx-dbSyNQ-dRKg1t-bCWqaR-d15fjC-cXEsEC-eVu9YR-cS2uKb-dnYfT5-cS2oNC-dnY9fM  Carte de Visite photograph back of Columbus W. Motes, Photographer in Athens, GA and a member of the NPA.

American photography organizations
Photography organizations established in the 19th century
Organizations established in 1868
1868 establishments in the United States
1880 disestablishments in the United States
1860s in the United States
1870s in the United States